Compulsus is a Canadian crime thriller film, directed by Tara Thorne and released in 2022. The film stars Lesley Smith as Wally, a lesbian who embarks on a vigilante crime spree to avenge the sexual assault of women.

Thorne's directorial debut, the film was inspired by Thelma & Louise. Its cast includes Koumbie, Hilary Adams, Kathleen Dorian, Kathryn McCormack and James MacLean.

The film premiered at the 2022 Inside Out Film and Video Festival, and was screened at the 2022 Fantasia Film Festival.

References

External links
 

2022 films
2022 directorial debut films
2022 thriller films
2022 LGBT-related films
Canadian crime thriller films
Canadian LGBT-related films
Lesbian-related films
LGBT-related thriller films
Films shot in Halifax, Nova Scotia
2020s Canadian films